NGC 1566, sometimes known as the Spanish Dancer, is an intermediate spiral galaxy in the constellation Dorado, positioned about 3.5° to the south of the star Gamma Doradus. It was discovered on May 28, 1826 by Scottish astronomer James Dunlop. At 10th magnitude, it requires a telescope to view.

This galaxy forms a member of the NGC 1566 subgroup of the Dorado Group, of which it is dominant and brightest member (although Kilborn and colleagues (2005) listed it as second brightest member of the NGC 1566 group after NGC 1553). The X-ray emission from the group is dominated by the hot gas halo of this galaxy, which extends out to  before merging with the background radiation. The galaxy appears to be interacting with smaller members of its subgroup. Radio emissions suggest the disk is asymmetrical and the neutral hydrogen gas shows a mild warp.

The morphological classification of NGC 1566 is SAB(rs)bc, which indicates a spiral galaxy with a weak bar structure around the nucleus (SAB), an incomplete ring around the bar (rs), and showing wound arms (bc). The spiral arms are strong and symmetrical. The northwest side of the galaxy is more strongly obscured by dust, suggesting it is the near side. The mass ratio of neutral hydrogen gas to the mass of the stars is 0.29, which is on the high side for a galaxy of this mass.

NGC 1566 is an active galaxy with many features of a Seyfert type 1, although the exact type remains uncertain. It is one of the closest and brightest Seyfert galaxies. The proximity of the galaxy, along with strong spiral arms and an active nucleus, have made it the subject of much scientific study in the astronomy community.

It was designated SN 2010el and was of type Iax. A second supernova was discovered on 11 November 2021:  SN 2021aefx (Type Ia, mag 12).

References

External links

 Spitzer Space Telescope page on NGC 1566
 Discovery image of SN 2010el (2010-06-19; The star to the left of the core of the galaxy is magnitude 12.3)
 

Intermediate spiral galaxies
Seyfert galaxies
Dorado (constellation)
Dorado Group
1566
14897